The 1995–96 BHL season was the 14th and final season of the British Hockey League, the top level of ice hockey in Great Britain. It was replaced by the Ice Hockey Superleague for 1996–97. 10 teams participated in the league, and the Sheffield Steelers won the league title by finishing first in the regular season. They also won the playoff championship.

Regular season

Playoffs

Group A

Group B

Semifinals
Sheffield Steelers 6-3 Humberside Hawks
Nottingham Panthers 3-1 Durham Wasps

Final
Sheffield Steelers 3-3 (2-1 SO) Nottingham Panthers

References

External links
Season on hockeyarchives.info

1
United
British Hockey League seasons